The Puerto Rico Federal Relations Act of 1950 was an Act of Congress of the 81st United States Congress. The United States Senate passed it unanimously. The United States House of Representatives passed it with one dissenting vote, from Vito Marcantonio who preferred full independence. President Harry Truman signed it into law on July 3, 1950. The act was enacted in order to enable the people of Puerto Rico to organize a local government pursuant to a constitution of their own, comparable to those of states and other territories of the United States. From its enactment until this day, the act has served as the organic law for the government of Puerto Rico and its relation with the United States as a whole.

Effects
The US Congress submitted the act for rejection or approval by the people of Puerto Rico in a referendum held in 1951, where it was approved by voters. As enacted by the act, such approval automatically authorized the Legislative Assembly of Puerto Rico to call for a constitutional convention in order to draft a constitution for Puerto Rico. Once assembled, this convention prepared a draft for a new constitution that was ultimately approved in a new referendum held on March 3, 1952. That constitution was then ratified by the 82nd United States Congress with a few amendments. This amended constitution was then officially proclaimed on July 25, 1952, immediately going into effect until this very day.

Once the constitution came into effect, the Puerto Rico Federal Relations Act automatically continued in force and effect the Jones–Shafroth Act, while repealing some of its provisions.

References

External links

Constitution of Puerto Rico
Government of Puerto Rico
Legal history of Puerto Rico
Political history of Puerto Rico
United States federal immigration and nationality legislation
United States federal territory and statehood legislation